Sidnei is a masculine given name of Portuguese origin. People with that name include:

 Sidnei (Cape Verdean footballer) (born 1986)
 Sidnei da Silva (born 1980), Brazilian footballer
 Sidnei (footballer, born 1983), full name Sidnei Siqueira Lourenço, Brazilian football left-back
 Sidnei Sciola (born 1986), Brazilian footballer 
 Sidnei Tendler (born 1958), Brazilian architect, poet, designer and painter
 Sidnei (footballer, born 1989), Sidnei Rechel da Silva Júnior, Brazilian football centre-back

See also 
 Sidney (disambiguation)
 Sydney (disambiguation)
 

Portuguese masculine given names